Isaia Gonewai is a Fijian politician. He is a former member of the Senate of Fiji where he represented the Province of Nadroga-Navosa.

References
Parliament of Fiji Islands website

I-Taukei Fijian members of the Senate (Fiji)
Living people
Year of birth missing (living people)
Place of birth missing (living people)
Politicians from Nadroga-Navosa Province
21st-century Fijian politicians